The American Independent Party (AIP) is a far-right political party in the United States that was established in 1967. The AIP is best known for its nomination of former Democratic Governor George Wallace of Alabama, who carried five states in the 1968 presidential election running on a populist, hardline anti-Communist, pro-"law and order" platform, appealing to working-class white voters and widely understood by political analysts as having pro-segregationist or white supremacist undertones, against Richard Nixon and Hubert Humphrey. In 1976, the party split into the modern American Independent Party and the American Party. From 1992 until 2008, the party was the California affiliate of the national Constitution Party. Its exit from the Constitution Party led to a leadership dispute during the 2016 election.

History

Wallace campaign and early history

In 1967, the AIP was founded by Bill Shearer and his wife, Eileen Knowland Shearer. It nominated George C. Wallace (Democrat) as its presidential candidate and retired U.S. Air Force General Curtis E. LeMay as the vice-presidential candidate. Wallace ran on every state ballot in the election, though he did not represent the American Independent Party in all fifty states: in Connecticut, for instance, he was listed on the ballot as the nominee of the "George Wallace Party." The Wallace/LeMay ticket received 13.5 percent of the popular vote and 46 electoral votes from the states of Arkansas, Louisiana, Mississippi, Georgia, and Alabama. No third-party candidate has won more than one electoral vote since the 1968 election.

In 1969, representatives from forty states established the American Party as the successor to the American Independent Party. In some places, such as Connecticut, the American Party was constituted as the American Conservative Party. (The modern American Conservative Party, founded in 2008, is unrelated to the Wallace-era party.) In March 1969, the party ran a candidate in a special election in Tennessee's 8th congressional district in northwestern Tennessee, where Wallace had done well the previous November, to replace Congressman Robert "Fats" Everett, who had died in office. Their candidate, William J. Davis, out-polled Republican Leonard Dunavant, with 16,375 votes to Dunavant's 15,773; but the race was carried by moderate Democrat Ed Jones, with 33,028 votes (47% of the vote).

The party flag, adopted on August 30, 1970, depicts an eagle holding a group of arrows in its left talons, over a compass rose, with a banner which reads "The American Independent Party" at the eagle's base.

The American Party had gained ballot access in Tennessee in 1970 as the result of George Wallace's strong (second-place) showing in the state in 1968, easily crossing the 5 percent threshold required, and held a primary election which nominated a slate of candidates including businessman Douglas Heinsohn for governor.  However, neither Heinsohn nor any other candidate running on the American Party line achieved the 5 percent threshold in the 1970 Tennessee election, and it likewise failed to do so in 1972, meaning that the party lost its newfound ballot access, which as of 2021 it has never regained.

In 1972, the American Party nominated Republican Congressman John G. Schmitz of California for president and Tennessee author Thomas Jefferson Anderson, both members of the John Birch Society, for vice president, winning the party over 1.1 million votes, the highest vote share the party has ever achieved since Wallace's run. In that election, Hall Lyons, a petroleum industry executive from Lafayette, Louisiana, and a former Republican, ran as the AP U.S. Senate nominee but finished last in a four-way race dominated by the Democratic nominee, J. Bennett Johnston, Jr.

After the 1976 split
In 1976, the American Independent Party split into the more moderate American Party, which included more northern conservatives and Schmitz supporters, and the American Independent Party, which focused on the Deep South. Both parties have nominated candidates for the presidency and other offices. Neither the American Party nor the American Independent Party has had national success, and the American Party has not achieved ballot status in any state since 1996.

In the early 1980s, Bill Shearer led the American Independent Party into the Populist Party. From 1992 to 2008, the American Independent Party was the California affiliate of the national Constitution Party, formerly the U.S. Taxpayers Party, whose founders included the late Howard Phillips.

2007 leadership dispute
A split in the American Independent Party occurred during the 2008 presidential campaign, one faction recognizing Jim King as chairman of the AIP with the other recognizing Ed Noonan as chairman. Noonan's faction claims the old AIP main website while the King organization claims the AIP's blog. King's group met in Los Angeles on June 28–29, elected King to state chair. Ed Noonan's faction, which included 8 of the 17 AIP officers, held a convention in Sacramento on July 5, 2008. Issues in the split were U.S. foreign policy and the influence of Constitution Party founder Howard Phillips on the state party.

The King group elected to stay in the Constitution Party and supported its presidential candidate, Chuck Baldwin. It was not listed as the "Qualified Political Party" by the California Secretary of State and Baldwin's name was not printed on the state's ballots. King's group sued for ballot access and their case was dismissed without prejudice.

The Noonan group voted to pull out of the Constitution Party and join a new party called America's Party, put together by perennial candidate and former United Nations Ambassador Alan Keyes as a vehicle for his own presidential campaign. Since Noonan was on record with the California Secretary of State as (outgoing) party chairman, Keyes was added to the state ballots as the AIP candidate. This group elected Markham Robinson as its new chair at the convention.

Presidential tickets

Since the fracture of the American Independent Party between the King and Noonan factions, control of the State Party, and thus the ballot line, has been in the hands of the Noonan faction. Attempts to nominate Chuck Baldwin (the 2008 Constitution nominee) or Virgil Goode (the 2012 Constitution nominee) were unsuccessful, as were their independent efforts to make it onto the California presidential ballot.

California gubernatorial candidates

Chairmen/Vice-Chairmen
Bill Shearer: 1967–1999
Nathan Johnson: 1999–2002
Jim King/: 2002–2004
Nancy Spirkoff: 2004–2006
Edward C. Noonan/Mark Seidenberg: 2006–2008
 Disputed: Jim King and Markham Robinson claim chairmanship: 2008–present

Membership and accidental-membership phenomenon
As of 2016, about 3% of California's 17.2 million voters are registered with the AIP, making the party the third-largest of California's political parties, although it is far behind the numbers registered with the Democrats (43%), Republicans (28%) and those stating "no party preference" (24%).

However, it has long been thought by political analysts that the party, which has received very few votes in recent California elections, maintains its state ballot status because people join the American Independent Party mistakenly believing that they are registering as "independent" voters. This was confirmed in a Los Angeles Times investigation in 2016, which found "overwhelming" and "indisputable" evidence that thousands of California voters who are registered as affiliated with the American Independent Party on voter forms in fact intended to be registered as "no party preference" (i.e., as independent voters). A 2016 poll conducted of California voters registered with the AIP showed that 73% identify themselves as "no affiliation" and 3% identify themselves as "undecided." Upon learning the AIP platform, 50% of registered AIP voters wanted to leave the AIP. A Times review of voting records revealed a wide array of Californians have fallen victim to this error, including celebrities such as Sugar Ray Leonard, Demi Moore, Emma Stone, and Kaley Cuoco.  Similarly, in 2008, Jennifer Siebel, then-fiancée of San Francisco's former Democratic mayor Gavin Newsom, attempted to change her party affiliation from Republican to unaffiliated, but "checked the American Independent box thinking that was what independent voters were supposed to do."

This confusion results in accidentally registered AIP members being unable to vote in presidential primary elections and, in prior years, in all partisan primary elections other than those of the AIP. A number of California registrars of voters had expressed concern over the confusion that the party's name causes. Kim Alexander, president of the nonpartisan California Voter Foundation, said that the California voter form was "confusing and somewhat misleading." However, since the advent of the "top-two" blanket primary in California in 2012, all voters may participate in non-presidential primary elections where nominations for public office are to be made. Presidential nominations and elections of members of party county central committees are still restricted to voters registered in the party where such contests are held, but a party may choose to allow voters with No Party Preference to vote in their presidential primary. In addition, voters are able to re-register to the party of their choosing on election day via election day registration, mitigating the issue further.

References

Notes

External links
American Independent Party of California
American Independent Party at JoinCalifornia

 
1967 establishments in California
American nationalist parties
Far-right political parties in the United States
Paleoconservative parties in the United States
Political parties established in 1967
Political parties in the United States